Light ergonomics is the relationship between the light source and the individual. Poor light can be divided into the following:

Individual or socio-cultural expectations
Insufficient light
Poor distribution of light
Improper contrast
Glare
Flicker
Thermal heating (over or under)
Acoustic noise (especially fluorescents)
Color spectrum (full-spectrum light, color temperature, etc.)

Effects of poor light
The effects of poor light can include the following:
low productivity
high human error rates
inability to match or select correct colors
eyestrain
headache
a reduction in mental alertness
general malaise
low employee morale

{| class="wikitable"
|- style="height:35px"
! colspan="2" | Recommended Illumination Levels
|- style="height:35px" align="center"
! Type of Activity !! Ranges of Illuminations (Lux)
|-
| Public spaces with dark surroundings || align="center" | 30
|-
| Simple orientation for short temporary visits || align="center" | 50
|-
| Working spaces where visual tasks are only occasionally performed || align="center" | 100
|-
| Performance of visual tasks of high contrast or large scale || align="center" | 300
|-
| Performance of visual tasks of medium contrast or small size || align="center" | 500
|-
| Performance of visual tasks of low contrast or very small size || align="center" | 1000
|-
| Performance of visual tasks near threshold of person's ability to recognize an image || align="center" | 3000-10000
|}

Types of light sources
{| class="wikitable"
|- style="height:35px"
! colspan="5" | Light Bulbs
|- style="height:35px" align="center"
! Type !! Common Application !! Efficiency !! Colour Rendering !! Fog-Smog Penetration
|-
| Incandescent || Homes || Poor || Good
|-
| Fluorescent || Home&Office || Good || Fair to good
|-
| Mercury || Factories, offices || Fair || Fair to moderate
|-
| Low pressure sodium || Roadway || Good || Poor || Good
|-
| High pressure sodium || Factories, commercial || Good || Fair to good|| Good
|-
| Metal Halide || Factories, commercial || Good || Good
|-
| Light-emitting diode (LED) || Home & office, commercial, industrial || Excellent|| Good
|-
|}

See also
 Ergonomics
 Full-spectrum light
 Artificial sunlight

References

Ergonomics